Rubus exeter is a rare North American species of flowering plant in the rose family. It has been found only in the north-central United States (Minnesota, Wisconsin, Indiana). 

The genetics of Rubus is extremely complex, so that it is difficult to decide on which groups should be recognized as species. There are many rare species with limited ranges such as this. Further study is suggested to clarify the taxonomy.

References

exeter
Plants described in 1941
Flora of the United States